"Love's Crashing Waves" is a song written by Difford & Tilbrook and released on their 1984 self-titled debut album.

Released as the first single from Difford & Tilbrook, "Love's Crashing Waves" saw moderate commercial success. Though considered the most commercial song on the album, it saw limited chart success: it was the act's only charting single in the UK (reaching number 57), and by 1985 Chris Difford and Glenn Tilbrook had re-formed their previous (and more popular) band, Squeeze. Difford recalled,

Squeeze have, on a few occasions, played this song live. Salon's Annie Zaleski described the song as a "sophisto-pop gem".

Track listing
7"
 "Love's Crashing Waves" (3:03)
 "Within These Walls of Without You" (2:59)

12"
 "Love's Crashing Waves" (3:03)
 "Within These Walls of Without You" (2:50)
 "Love's Crashing Waves (Extended Remix)" (4:50)

References

External links
Squeeze, Difford & Tilbrook discography at Squeezenet

1984 debut singles
Difford & Tilbrook songs
Songs written by Glenn Tilbrook
Songs written by Chris Difford
Song recordings produced by Tony Visconti
1984 songs
A&M Records singles